Murder in Mind is the second album (though first not to be banned) by death metal band Desecration.

Track listing https://open.spotify.com/album/7sVoWoh2rxUIvFzAs42fYN
"Intro"
"Murder in Mind"
"Impaled"
"Cerebral Annoxia"
"Stillborn Climax"
"Beyond Recognition"
"Bathroom Autopsy"
"Victimised"
"Incestual Sodomy"
"Obscene Publication"
"Crave for Rot"

Written by:
Paul Arlett
Glenn Thomas
Jason Jad Davies
John Young

References

1998 albums
Desecration (band) albums